Saint-Henri Church is a former Roman Catholic church in Montreal, Quebec, Canada. It is located at 872 du Couvent Street in the Saint-Henri neighbourhood of the Southwest borough.

History
The Saint-Henri parish was established in 1867 following the division of the Notre-Dame parish. A church, Église de Saint-Henri, had been constructed in the Saint-Henri parish, however it was demolished in 1968 in order to construct École secondaire Saint-Henri in that location.

Saint Thomas Aquinas Church was constructed for the Irish community based on a design by architect Joseph Albert Karch. It opened in 1923. The church's main facade was constructed of stone, with the side walls constructed of brick.

The Saint-Henri parish church became the former Saint Thomas Aquinas Church, and was renamed Église de Saint-Henri in 1968.

The church closed altogether in 2001, becoming a community centre. It became the Hôtel des Encans (Iegor Auction House) in 2004.

References

Roman Catholic churches in Montreal
Le Sud-Ouest
Roman Catholic churches completed in 1923
20th-century Roman Catholic church buildings in Canada